Throne is a surname. Notable people with the surname include:
Malachi Throne (1928–2013), American actor
Mary Throne (born 1960), American politician